Yvonne Frances Barrett (19462 September 1985) was an Australian pop singer. She reached the top 60 Kent Music Report singles chart with her cover versions of Petula Clark single "You're the One"/"Little People", in October 1965. She released other singles in that, and the following, decade. Barrett also appeared on TV shows in the 1960s and 1970s. She became a session singer and performed on the club circuit. Barrett married Hoang Van Truong, a former Vietnam War veteran, in December 1983; the couple separated in the following year. Truong was found guilty of Barrett's 1985 murder and was sentenced to life imprisonment without parole, in August 1986.

Biography

Yvonne Barrett was the daughter of Ted and Sheila Barrett, and was raised with two siblings. The family lived in Braybrook, Victoria. Barrett started ballet lessons at the age of two and a half. In January 1957 she performed in the pantomime, Jack and Jill, at the Princess Theatre, Melbourne. In 1963 she joined the cast of Swallow's Juniors, a children's TV talent contest and entertainment show on HSV7. She took singing lessons in her mid-teens, which led to musical theatre including, The Sound of Music, in the role of Louisa von Trapp, at the Princess Theatre in October 1961. She subsequently appeared in Carnival!, Wild Cat and Stop the World – I Want to Get Off. Barrett described working in musicals to The Australian Women's Weeklys correspondent in July 1964, "I love everything about the theatre. We work odd hours, but it doesn't worry me. I've never known a nine to five job – and it's wonderful to be able to sleep in in the mornings."

Barrett became a regular on pop music TV program, The Go!! Show, by 1965, where she performed her renditions, "Off & Running", "I Walk Alone" and the Toys' "A Lovers Concerto". She was signed to the related Go!! Records label, which issued her first three singles. She achieved her highest chart success with her cover version of Petula Clark's "You're the One" backed by her rendition of Chloee Harris' "Little People", in October 1965. In December Barrett, along with fellow TV personalities, Ian Turpie, Tommy Hanlon Jr and Pat Carroll, entertained Australian troops during the Vietnam War. They were "the
first Government-sponsored entertainment team" to visit the Australian troops in Vietnam. Her next single, "Send Her Away", appeared in July 1966 and was followed by "Don't Bother Callin'" in October; Australian musicologist, Ian McFarlane, described the singles as, "minor hits in Melbourne."

Barrett and Carroll returned to Vietnam for another tour in August 1968. Barrett was presented with a Việt Cộng flag during one of her two tours. Australian pop music newspaper, Go-Set (not related to Go!! Show or Go!! Records), published an annual poll of their readers, which included female-based categories, where she was listed at No. 7 Girl Vocal (1966), No. 6 Top Girl Singer (1967), No. 7 Female Vocal (1969), No. 5 Girl (1970), No. 6 Best Girl Vocal (1971) and No. 6 Female Vocalist (1972). In 1970 she released a single, "Lu" (originally by Laura Nyro), which featured her big voice with a brassy jazz-rock, Blood Sweat & Tears arrangement.

Although not achieving further chart success she retained popularity due to live appearances, and being on national TV shows, Uptight and Happening 70-72. She performed "Always Something There to Remind Me" and Rare Earth's, "Get Ready". During the 1970s she moved into session work and club appearances, and was a regular on Mary Hardy's The Penthouse Club on HSV7. Soon after she moved to Perth. In the 1980s Yvonne Barrett moved from Perth to Sydney and was working as a waitress.

Barrett married former Vietnam War veteran, Hoang Van Truong, in December 1983; they had met in a Perth nightclub. The couple separated in the following year.

Death

Barrett's body was found on 3 September 1985, at her unit in Birchgrove, New South Wales. Her estranged husband, Truong, was found guilty of her murder; he had spent the night with her, and strangled her in the morning when she asked him to leave.

Barrett's funeral was held at Christ the King, Catholic Church, Braybrook, Victoria. It was attended by Australian show business celebrities including, Bert and Patti Newton. Patti posted a condolence notice in The Age, "What wonderful times to remember of growing up together." Barrett was buried at Altona Memorial Park, Victoria.

Discography

Singles 

 "Little People" / "You're the One" (October 1965) – Go!! Records KMR No. 58, Melbourne: No. 28, Sydney: No. 3
 "Send Her Away" / "Won't Someone Say" (July 1966) – Go!! Records
 "Don't Bother Callin'" / "I'm Taking Him Back" (October 1966) – Go!! Records
 "Lu" / "Picture Me Gone" (March 1970) – Columbia / EMI)
 "No Longer Part of Your Life" / "Mr 7654312" (1972) – Albert Productions

TELEVISION

Awards and nominations

Go-Set Pop Poll
The Go-Set Pop Poll was coordinated by teen-oriented pop music newspaper, Go-Set and was established in February 1966 and conducted an annual poll during 1966 to 1972 of its readers to determine the most popular personalities.

|-
| 1970
| herself
| Girl Vocal
| 5th
|-

References

General
 
 
 
 
 Gavin Ryan's Chart Books
Specific

External links
 The Go! Show at MilesAgo website
 Reference to performance at Bien Hoa, Vietnam 23 December 1965
 Go-Set Pop Poll Album cover
 
 

1946 births
1985 deaths
Singers from Melbourne
Barrett, Yvonne
20th-century Australian women singers
People murdered in New South Wales
People from Braybrook, Victoria